Josh Tomlinson (born 1 December 2005) is an English professional footballer who plays as a defender for  club Harborough Town, on loan from  club Northampton Town.

Career
Tomlinson made his first-team debut for Northampton Town aged 15 years and 336 days, making him the youngest player in the club's history when he played in a centre-back partnership with Dominic Revan in a 2–1 defeat to Brighton & Hove Albion U21 in an EFL Trophy match at Sixfields Stadium; manager Jon Brady said that "he hardly put a foot wrong, his distribution was good and he read the game well". On 18 October 2022, he became the youngest goalscorer in the club's history when he scored in a 3–1 home defeat to Arsenal U21 at the age of 16 years and 321 days. He signed his first professional contract the following month, having also played a record amount of times for the under-18 team after becoming the youngest player to represent them at the age of thirteen. On 24 December 2022, he joined Northern Premier League Midlands side Harborough Town on a one month loan.

Career statistics

References

2005 births
Living people
Sportspeople from Kettering
English footballers
Association football defenders
Northampton Town F.C. players
Harborough Town F.C. players
English Football League players
Northern Premier League players